All Saints Church in Otterhampton, Somerset, England, overlooks the River Parrett.  The church dates from the 14th century.  It is recorded in the National Heritage List for England as a designated Grade II* listed building, and is a redundant church in the care of the Churches Conservation Trust.  It was declared redundant on 1 March 1988, and was vested in the Trust on 2 August 1989.

A church was established on the site in the 12th century, was valued at £5 in 1291, although the current building largely dates from the 14th. The Perpendicular west tower was added later and has an Elizabethan bell-frame with 4 bells, one of which dates from the 16th century and two others are dated 1617 and 1737. The original dedication was to Saint Peter, however it was later renamed All Saints.

The interior includes a Norman font with a Jacobean cover, a screen from the 16th century, and 17th-century communion rails. It was closed in 1988, and is now in the care of the Churches Conservation Trust.

See also
 List of churches preserved by the Churches Conservation Trust in South West England
 List of ecclesiastical parishes in the Diocese of Bath and Wells

References

External links

14th-century church buildings in England
Church of England church buildings in Sedgemoor
Grade II* listed churches in Somerset
Grade II* listed buildings in Sedgemoor
Churches preserved by the Churches Conservation Trust
Former churches in Somerset